Corynephorus canescens,  common name grey hair-grass or gray clubawn grass, is a species of plants in the grass family, native to Europe, the Middle East, and North Africa but widely naturalized in North America. In the United Kingdom it is rare. It can be found at sites such as Wangford Warren and Carr, a Site of Special Scientific Interest in the Breckland area of Suffolk.

Description
Both the upper and lower glumes are shiny, lanceolate, and membranous. The lemma have a dorsal awn and dentate apex with obscure lateral veins. The floret callus is hairy with rhachilla internodes being pilose.

References

Pooideae
Grasses of Africa
Grasses of Asia
Grasses of Europe
Flora of North Africa
Plants described in 1753
Taxa named by Carl Linnaeus
Taxa named by Palisot de Beauvois